Randy Ribay is an American writer of middle grade and young adult fiction. Ribay has won the 2019 Freeman Book Award from the National Consortium for Teaching About Asia and was a finalist for the 2019 National Book Awards for Young People's Literature category for his book Patron Saints of Nothing.

Personal life 
Born in the Philippines and raised in the Midwest, Ribay was originally an aerospace engineering major [Harvard News 2020] who changed his major to English literature and earned his BA in English literature from the University of Colorado at Boulder. His master's degree was in language and literacy from Harvard Graduate School of Education.

Ribay teaches high school English in San Francisco, CA.

He began his writing career by writing poetry but broke into the prose writing scene by participating in Pitch Slam at a Writer's Digest annual conference.

Career

Patron Saints of Nothing 
Ribay is the author of the award-winning book Patron Saints of Nothing (2019). Although initially rejected by several editors, the book won the Freeman Award and was short-listed for the National Book Awards for Young People's Literature in 2019. The book was also nominated for the 2020 Edgar Awards chosen by the Mystery Writers of America. Patron Saints of Nothing appeared on several Best of 2019 lists including those published by NPR, Kirkus, and the New York Public Library

The book is a coming-of-age story about Jay Reguero, a Filipino-American boy of high school age. Reguero travels to the Philippines to find out the story behind a cousin killed in an ongoing drug war based on the nonfictional drug war established by Philippines president Rodrigo Duterte. Once there, he must reevaluate his heritage and his status as a Filipino-American outsider.

Ribay considered the book to be dedicated to the "hyphenated", referring to his Filipino-American heritage.

Bibliography 

 An Infinite Number of Parallel Universes (2015)
 After The Shot Drops (2018)
 Patron Saints of Nothing (2019)

References 

University of Colorado Boulder alumni
Harvard Graduate School of Education alumni
American male novelists
Year of birth missing (living people)
Living people